The West Mexican euphonia (Euphonia godmani) is a species of bird in the family Fringillidae. It was split from the scrub euphonia (Euphonia affinis) in 2021.

Distribution and habitat
It is found in Mexico.  Its natural habitats are subtropical or tropical dry forest, subtropical or tropical moist lowland forest, and heavily degraded former forest.

References

West Mexican euphonia
Endemic birds of Mexico
West Mexican euphonia
West Mexican euphonia